El Djem Archaeological Museum is an archaeological museum located in El Djem, Tunisia. It contains Roman era art, including mythological personages, abstract elements and fauna.

See also

African archaeology
Chemtou Museum
Culture of Tunisia
List of museums in Tunisia
Nabeul Museum
Virtual Tunisian Culture

References

 

Museums with year of establishment missing
Archaeological museums in Tunisia
El Djem